Cocconato is a comune (municipality) in the Province of Asti in the Italian region Piedmont, located about  east of Turin and about  northwest of Asti.

Cocconato borders the following municipalities: Aramengo, Brozolo, Montiglio Monferrato, Moransengo, Passerano Marmorito, Piovà Massaia, Robella, and Tonengo. It is located on a hill in the Montferrat traditional region, its economy being based on gastronomy (milk, cheese including the robiola of Cocconato) and agriculture.

References

Cities and towns in Piedmont